Dragons of Faith is the second of four parts in the third major story arc of the Dungeons & Dragons Dragonlance series of game modules. It is one of the 14 Dragonlance adventures published by TSR between 1984 and 1986. Its cover features a painting by Jeff Easley.

Plot synopsis
Dragons of Faith is a continuation of the Dragonlance story.  It begins about a month after the party leaves the elven forest of Silvanesti and concludes some time after they leave the city of Istar. The prologue gives the background and the story up to that point, as well as an overview of the way events should proceed in the module for the Dungeon Master to reference. In this scenario, the player characters flee the evil city of Flotsam and cross the Blood Sea, where they encounter Istar, the City of the Deep, and become involved in an undersea battle. In the undersea city of Istar, the sea elves are under threat from a group of the dragon armies. At this point, if the Battlesystem rules are used, the major underwater battle involving Istar can be run, for which new rules are given. The Dungeon Master draws from a deck of Talis cards (the tarot of Krynn), to determine the events of the adventure.

After this battle, the player characters must sail across the Blood Sea of Istar into enemy territory, evade the forces of the Dragon Highlords and according to the module's teaser, "capture the crucial pawn before darkness snatches it away!"

This module can be played as a stand-alone adventure or used as part of the larger sequence of Dragonlance adventures.

Contents
The module includes a sheet of cut-apart Talis cards, as well as statistics and counters for an underwater Battlesystem battle. The cover has character cards for the pre-generated characters, plus two new characters (one of whom is a new kender). The cover also includes a combined monster statistics chart and a set of maps indicating where the action takes place. This set of maps is a double-sided large sheet showing various smaller locations in the adventure on one side, while the other side of the sheet has a larger map of the main battle area for use with the Battlesystem rules. The text gives details of how to use the Talis cards to predict forthcoming events during the adventure, as well as for games of chance. There are sixty-four pages in the module, sixteen of which are pull-outs, including character cards for twenty non-player characters.

Publication history
DL12 Dragons of Faith was written by Harold Johnson and Bruce Heard, with a cover by Jeff Easley and interior illustrations by Diana Magnuson, and was published by TSR in 1986 as a 64-page booklet with a large map, cardstock sheet, cardstock counter sheet, and an outer folder.

A pack of Talis cards, a fictional Krynnian card game, was included, along with rules for various games that could be played with them.  Also included were Battlesystem miniatures rules.

Dragons of Faith was later updated for AD&D 2nd edition rules and included in "Dragonlance Classics III", which condensed the last four Dragonlance modules into one book.

Reception
John S. Davies reviewed Dragons of Faith for the British magazine Adventurer #3 (August/September 1986). He notes that while this is the twelfth module in the Dragonlance series, it is only the tenth playable Dragonlance scenario. He noted that on the large sheet of maps, the city map is not numbered despite there being numbered locations given in the text, and one of the buildings is given a different name on the map sheet than in the module. Davies comments that Dragons of Faith "departs from the style of previous Dragonlance modules, in that it gives a lot of general background information for those areas that are not in the main storyline, and allows the characters a lot more freedom in how they reach their eventual goal". He goes on to say: "There is a lot going on, with various sub-plots for the characters to get mixed up in, some of which will reward them with useful information. Fortunately, DL12 does not have the complexity of DL10, though the DM still has a lot to keep track of." However, he adds that "Although there is a lot of freedom for the characters, they are still given plenty of guidance to get them back on the main plot, should they stray too far. There is also enough given for the DM to run a whole series of mini-adventures around the main plot." Davies concluded the review by saying the adventure was worthwhile and that the adventure "although expensive, is a pleasing continuation of the Dragonlance saga, though it does not work as a stand alone module".

References

External links
 Full synopsis at a fan made TSR archive

Dragonlance adventures
Role-playing game supplements introduced in 1986